Randles Hill is a hill located in the suburb of Mulgampola in Kandy, Sri Lanka.

History
Randles Hill received its name when Sir John Scurrah Randles (1875 - 1945) generously donated the money (Rs. 50,000) through the Wesleyan Methodist Missionary Society to purchase a significant land parcel, for the relocation and construction of Kingswood College. Randles was a prominent Methodist, English parliamentarian and philanthropist. Randles's significant gift came as a result of a visit to the district by Rev. William Goudie (1857 - 1922) and Mr Robert Simpson, a prominent member of the laymen's missionary movement, who on return to England convinced Randles of the benefit of such a contribution. Randles subsequently donated a further Rs. 180,626 to the construction of the college buildings. The area was named as Randles Hill by the founder of Kingswood College, L. E. Blaze.

Randles Hill Railway Station

Randles Hill Railway Station is the second school based railway station in Sri Lanka. The first such railway station is at Richmond Hill, which services Rippon College and Richmond College in Galle.
 
The Randles Hill station is actually a railway halt located on the Matale Line, close to the level crossing at Mulgampola, between Peradeniya Junction and Kandy railway station.

References

Kandy
Hills of Sri Lanka
Landforms of Central Province, Sri Lanka